Erdene-Ochiryn Dolgormaa (born July 26, 1977, in Ulaanbaatar) is a Mongolian judoka, who competed in the women's heavyweight category. She picked up five medals in her career, including a bronze from the 2002 Asian Games in Busan, and represented her nation Mongolia in the over-78 kg division at the 2004 Summer Olympics.

Dolgormaa made sporting headlines in the international scene at the 2002 Asian Games in Busan, South Korea, where she scored a waza-ari victory over Chinese Taipei's Lee Hsiao-hung to earn a bronze medal in the over-78 kg division.

At the 2004 Summer Olympics in Athens, Dolgormaa qualified for the Mongolian squad in the women's heavyweight class (+78 kg), by placing second and receiving a berth from the Asian Championships in Almaty, Kazakhstan. She thwarted her former rival Lee Hsiao-hung in the opening match with a yuko (15-second hold), before losing out to her next opponent Maryna Prokofyeva of Ukraine by a waza-ari awasete ippon and a kuzure kesa gatame within one minute and sixteen seconds.

References

External links
 

1977 births
Living people
Mongolian female judoka
Olympic judoka of Mongolia
Judoka at the 2004 Summer Olympics
Judoka at the 2002 Asian Games
Asian Games medalists in judo
Sportspeople from Ulaanbaatar
Asian Games bronze medalists for Mongolia
Medalists at the 2002 Asian Games
20th-century Mongolian women
21st-century Mongolian women